The arboreal emo skink (Emoia pseudopallidiceps) is a species of lizard in the family Scincidae. It is found in Papua New Guinea.

References

Emoia
Reptiles described in 1991
Reptiles of Papua New Guinea
Endemic fauna of Papua New Guinea
Taxa named by Walter Creighton Brown
Skinks of New Guinea